The Lake Border Moraine (also called the Lake Border Morainic System) is a complex group of moraines bordering the southern end of Lake Michigan. It can be traced north along the eastern shore of the lake basin and across the highlands between the northern Lake Michigan and Saginaw Bay. It continues around the Saginaw Basin into the "thumb" of Michigan, and south through southeastern Michigan on the eastern side of the "thumb." Along Lake Michigan, north to Holland the system is close to the shore. In Oceana County it forms the prominent "clay banks" along the shoreline of Lake Michigan. It again bears inland from Hart, where more recent moraines reside between it and Lake Michigan. It runs north of the great interlobate moraine that exists between the Lake Michigan and Saginaw lobes of the Laurentian ice sheet. A little north of Cadillac turns to the east. A short distance from Cadillac, it splits with the southern ridge or outer member heading to the Saginaw basin. The northern ridge heads towards Lake Huron, but turns south before reaching the shore. In Newaygo and Lake counties it rest on an earlier interlobate moraine. It separates in Wexford and Missaukee counties to continue south along the west side of the Saginaw basin.

Topography
The south the ridge declines from here, but much of it is above . South of Big Rapids there are a few high spots above . These continue south to Baldwin. The ridges south of Muskegon River are just under .
The ridge runs west across Oceana County nearly to Lake Michigan.
The inner ridge is highest in the north near Gaylord. It lowers steadily to the southwest, but remains above the  through Antrim and Kalkaska counties. To the south, it remains near  through Grand Traverse County and on to Manistee County. South of Manistee River the ridges on the inner border fall below  with the general surface below

Relief

See also
Glenwood Shoreline
Lake Chicago
List of glacial moraines

References

The Illinois Ice Lobe; Frank Leverett; U.S. Geological Survey, Monograph, #38; Government Printing Office; Washington, D.C.; 1899
 Chapter X, Later Moraines of the Lake Michigan, Saginaw, and Huron-Erie Lobes, Lake Border Morainic System of Lake Michigan Lobe; Frank Leverett The Pleistocene of Indiana and Michigan, History of the Great Lakes; Monographs of the United States Geological Survey, Vol. LIII; Frank Leverett and Frank B. Taylor; Washington, D.C,; Government Printing Office; 1915

Moraines of the United States
Geological history of the Great Lakes
Lake Michigan
Geology of Indiana
Geology of Michigan
Moraines of Indiana